The  20.3 cm/45 Type 41 naval gun was a Japanese naval and coast-defense gun used on cruisers of the Imperial Japanese Navy from the Russo-Japanese War through the end of World War II.

Design and development
The 20.3 cm/45 Type 41 naval gun was a designation applied to existing foreign produced EOC 8 inch 45 caliber Pattern S, U, W guns which had been produced by Armstrong of Great Britain and Ansaldo of Italy and a license-produced Japanese variant. Licensed production of Japanese guns based on Pattern S drawings began in 1902 and in 1908 a modified version with a different rifling pattern and a resized propellant chamber was produced. Ships produced before 1902 in foreign shipyards most likely had Pattern S, U, W guns. While ships produced or refit after 1902 in Japanese shipyards most likely have Japanese-built guns. These weapons were officially designated as Type 41 on 25 December 1908, and re-designated again on 5 October 1917 in centimeters.

The first ship armed with these guns was the protected cruiser  completed in 1898 by Armstrong and armed with Pattern S guns. The last ships armed with these guns were probably the Ibuki-class armored cruisers built between 1905–1911. Many of these ships were disarmed under the conditions of the Washington Naval Treaty or subsequent London Naval Treaty and their guns converted into coastal artillery batteries, including installations at Tokyo Bay, Tarawa and later at Wake Island during World War II.

Gallery

Notes

References
 Bishop, Chris (eds) The Encyclopedia of Weapons of World War II. Barnes & Nobel. 1998.

External links

Naval guns of Japan
203 mm artillery